
Gmina Sieraków is an urban-rural gmina (administrative district) in Międzychód County, Greater Poland Voivodeship, in west-central Poland.

Villages
Apart from the town of Sieraków, Gmina Sieraków contains the villages and settlements of Błota, Borowy Młyn, Bucharzewo, Chalin, Chorzępowo, Czapliniec, Dębowiec, Góra, Gospódka, Grobia, Izdebno, Jabłonowo, Jeleniec, Jeziorno, Kaczlin, Kłosowice, Kobylarnia, Kukułka, Ławica, Lichwin, Lutom, Lutomek, Marianowo, Pławiska, Przemyśl, Śrem and Tuchola.

Neighbouring gminas
Gmina Sieraków is bordered by the gminas of Chrzypsko Wielkie, Drawsko, Drezdenko, Kwilcz, Międzychód and Wronki.

References

Sierakow
Międzychód County